Eurofly was a privately owned airline based in Milan, Italy. Listed on MTA Stock Exchange and controlled by Meridiana, it was Italy's leading carrier in the leisure flights market and mainly operated international, medium to long haul,  point-to-point flights.

The medium-haul activity was centered mainly on operations to Egypt and the Red Sea Riviera, Spain and Greece.  The long haul included some of Italians’ preferred tropical destinations like the Maldives and Sri Lanka or Africa. Furthermore, during the summer season, Eurofly operated non-stop scheduled flights to New York City, exploiting the reverse seasonality of if compared to tropical destinations and focusing on incoming traffic to Italy.  The company slogan was The Italian [air]way of life.

In 2010, the airline merged with Meridiana to form Meridiana Fly (but returned to its name Meridiana after merging with Air Italy).

History
The airline was established on 26 May 1989 with the aim of selling medium-haul flights to tour operators. Eurofly started its operations on 26 February 1990. It was set up with a 45% shareholding by Alitalia in response to the needs of the flag carrier to develop the leisure travel market. The original shareholding was divided between Alitalia (45%), Olivetti (45%) and San Paolo Finance (10%). There have been several changes of ownership since.

In January 2004, Eurofly was acquired by Profilo Spinnkaer Private Equity Fund, managed by Sandro Capotosti (CEO and Founder of Banca Prolilo) and Paolo G. Alberoni. The Fund listed Eurofly on the Milan Stock Exhange in December 2005   At the end of 2006, Spinnaker sold the residual 29,95% stake in Eurofly  to Meridiana and Mr Giovanni Rossi (CEO of Meridiana) took over the CEO position in Eurofly.

In January 2008, two capital increases took place and Meridiana participation in Eurofly's capital grew to 46.1%.

On 28 February 2010, Meridiana and Eurofly merged to create Italy's second-biggest airline. The new airline is called Meridiana fly (Later Replaced & Return To Meridiana former name after the Merge Of Air Italy). For now, both airlines aircraft will continue to carry their individual logos. However, Eurofly's GJ code will immediately disappear and be replaced by Meridiana's IG code.

By 2013 & 2014, all of the Eurofly Airbus fleet that was merged with Meridiana to create Meridiana Fly (later to return to its former name Meridiana after merging with Air Italy) were by Boeing aircraft to pursue the aim of operating an all Boeing fleet together with Air Italy. All Airbus aircraft Eurofly formerly owned are currently still flying under its new owners.

Destinations 
Before eurofly was acquired by Meridiana, the airline had 2 codeshare agreements which are with Air One and British Airways.

Fleet
The Eurofly fleet consisted of the following aircraft (as of February 2010). As of 4 July 2009, the average age of the Eurofly fleet was 6.8 years.

See also

 List of defunct airlines of Italy

References

External links

Official website (European site)
Official website (European site) 
Official website (Indian site)
Official website (U.S. site)
Official website (U.S. Vacations site)
Eurofly Fleet

Italian companies established in 1989
Italian companies disestablished in 2010
Defunct airlines of Italy
Airlines established in 1989
Companies based in Milan
Airlines disestablished in 2010